The Mettawee-class gasoline tanker was a class of small gasoline tankers based on the Maritime Commission standard T1-M-A2 hull that served in World War II.  The ships were completed between 1943 and 1945.  Despite being charged with the dangerous task of carrying a highly volatile cargo into battle, none of the Mettawee-class tankers were destroyed, but the  capsized near Iwo Jima on 6 June 1945.

Ships in class

References
 
 

Auxiliary ship classes of the United States Navy
 Mettawee class gasoline tanker
 Mettawee class gasoline tanker
Auxiliary transport ship classes